Air Mail Pilot is a 1928 American silent action film directed by Gene Carroll and starring Earl Metcalfe,  Blanche Mehaffey and DeWitt Jennings.

Cast
 Jimmy Fulton as Jimmie Dean 
 Earl Metcalfe as Tom Miller 
 Blanche Mehaffey as Ruth Ross 
 DeWitt Jennings as Robert Ross 
 Max Hawley as Hap Lester 
 Carl Stockdale as Addison Simms

References

Bibliography
 Paris, Michael. From the Wright Brothers to Top Gun: Aviation, Nationalism, and Popular Cinema. Manchester University Press, 1995.

External links

1928 films
1920s action films
American action films
American silent feature films
1920s English-language films
American black-and-white films
1920s American films
Silent action films